Groundbait is a fishing bait that is either thrown or "balled" into the water in order to olfactorily attract more fish to a designated area (i.e. fishing ground) for more efficient catching via angling, netting, trapping, or even spearing and shooting.  Groundbaits are typically scattered separately from the hook and usually before even casting any rod or net, although in bottom fishing they can be deployed synchronously with hookbaits while contained inside a gradual-release device also attached to the fishing line known as a method feeder. 

Groundbaits are often used in freshwater coarse fishing (where the target fish are commonly omnivorous or algivorous and might not be easily drawn to the hookbait), and can be custom-made personally by the angler or bulk-purchased from dedicated manufacturers. There are many different recipes of groundbaits that can be used to target specific species of fish. Groundbait can differ by the sizes of the crumbs, type of seed, colour and smell. The angler can also mix additives to the groundbait to alter its firmness in order to control the rate of bait release or breakdown once in the water.

Groundbaits used in blue water fishing are known as "chums", which consist of freshly cut parts of a slaughtered fish often added with blood and offals, in order to attract large predatory fishes.

Technique

Groundbait is a mixture of various natural ingredients, for example fishmeal, bread crumbs, vanilla sugar, hemp seeds or oil, maize and other ingredients, which are then moistened with water and formed into bait balls, which are then cast into the water at the fishing spot as an "appetizer". Depending on the groundbait mixture, the balls may break up quickly and create a "cloud" of particles in the water attractive for mid-water feeding fish, or sink to the bottom where they slowly release scents to species feeding on the bottom.

The amount of groundbait is optimized to draw as many fish as possible to the fishing place, enticing them to freely consume without overfeeding, which will otherwise stop the fish from biting the actual hookbait.  Anglers may use groundbait at the fishing site (or swim) for several days before fishing to stimiulate the taste of the fish, and then cease groundbaiting for a brief period to allow the fish to regain their appetite before the actual fishing begins.

One method of focusing the fish-drawing is to simply squeeze a ball of groundbait onto the line just above the hook. This way, any fish attracted by the groundbait will be at close proximity to the hook and therefore more likely to also swallow the hookbait.

Method feeder 
Another method of distributing groundbait close to the hookbait is by using a method feeder (or just "feeder" for short), which is a cage/wire container mounted adjacent to the hookbait on the fishing line. Feeders hold compact, moistened groundbait and other particle baits that are gradually released in the water. When the line is cast out, the feeder disperses its contents right near the bait, attracting fish from a wider area specifically towards the hook location. The feeder enclosure also prevents the groundbaits from rapid depletion by a feeding frenzy, which would otherwise cause the fish to become satious from overconsuming the groundbait and thus no longer interested in swallowing the actual hookbait.

The combined mass of the feeder and its contents also serves the function of a sinker, as well as adding momentum to the terminal tackles and hence allowing a greater casting distance.

Regulation
Due to concerns about the ecological impact of introducing nutrients to a water, acting as fertilizer, angling in some waters is affected by regulations on groundbait use. Where groundbait is banned, soil or loam is sometimes used as a substitute.

Other Uses
The BBC have used the term to describe popular TV shows, placed immediately before newscasts or broadcasts of a socially pertinent nature, to draw in viewers.

In Austria, the German term Anfüttern is used to mean a way of bribing, particularly in regard to political corruption.

See also
 Chumming
 Fishing bait

Notes

References

Further reading

 Cryer M and Edwards RW (1987) "The impact of angler ground bait on benthic invertebrates and sediment respiration in a shallow eutrophic reservoir". Environmental Pollution, 46: 137–150.
 Edwards RW and Fouracre VA (1983) "Is the banning of ground baiting in reservoirs justified?" In: Proceedings of the Third British Freshwater Fisheries Conference, University of Liverpool, pp. 89–94.

External links
 Types of ground bait & how to mix

Fishing equipment